Bicycle Day  may refer to:
 World Bicycle Day, declared by United Nations General Assembly in 2018, to be celebrated on 3rd June, globally. 
 "Bicycle Day", the first recorded LSD "trip" by Albert Hofmann, April 19, 1943. This is celebrated on April 19 annually generally through the use of LSD